Orange (Provençal: Aurenja  or Aurenjo ) is a commune in the Vaucluse department in the Provence-Alpes-Côte d'Azur region in southeastern France. Orange is the second-most populated city in Vaucluse, after Avignon.

Name 
The settlement is attested as Arausio and Arausion in the first and second centuries AD, then as civitas Arausione in the fourth century, civitas Arausicae in 517 (via a Germanized form *Arausinga), Aurengia civitatis in 1136, and as Orenga in 1205.

The name Arausio can be explained as the Gaulish ar-aus(i)o- ('temple, cheek'), itself derived from an earlier Proto-Celtic *far-aws(y)o-, which literally means 'in front of the ear' (cf. Old Irish ara, arae; Ancient Greek pareiaí, parauai < *par-ausiā). It is cognate with the name of other ancient settlements, including Arausa, Arausia, Arausona (Dalmatia) and the nearby Oraison (Alpes-de-Haute-Provence).

History

Roman Orange was founded in 35 BC by veterans of the second legion as Arausio (after the local Celtic water god), or Colonia Julia Firma Secundanorum Arausio in full, "the Julian colony of Arausio established by the soldiers of the second legion." The name was originally unrelated to that of the orange fruit, but was later conflated with it.

A previous Celtic settlement with that name existed in the same place, and a major battle, which is generally known as the Battle of Arausio, had been fought in 105 BC between two Roman armies and the Cimbri and Teutones tribes.

It was the capital of a wide area of northern Provence, which was parcelled up into lots for the Roman colonists. "Orange of two thousand years ago was a miniature Rome, complete with many of the public buildings that would have been familiar to a citizen  of the Roman Empire, except that the scale of the buildings had been reduced – a smaller theater to accommodate a smaller population, for example." It is found in both the Tabula Peutingeriana and Le cadastre d'Orange maps.
 
The town prospered, but was sacked by the Visigoths in 412. It had, by then, become largely Christianised, and from the end of the third century constituted the Ancient Diocese of Orange. No longer a residential bishopric, Arausio, as it is called in Latin, is today listed by the Roman Catholic Church as a titular see. It hosted two important synods, in 441 and 529. The Second Council of Orange was of importance in condemning what later came to be called Semipelagianism.

The sovereign Carolingian counts of Orange had their origin in the eighth century; they passed into the family of the lords of Baux. From the 12th century, Orange was raised to a minor principality, the Principality of Orange, as a fief of the Holy Roman Empire. During this period, the town and the principality of Orange belonged to the administration and province of Dauphiné.

When William the Silent, count of Nassau, with estates in the Netherlands, inherited the title Prince of Orange in 1544, the principality was incorporated into the holdings of what became the House of Orange-Nassau. This pitched it into the Protestant side in the Wars of Religion, during which the town was badly damaged. In 1568, the Eighty Years' War began with William as stadtholder leading the bid for independence from Spain. William the Silent was assassinated in Delft in 1584. His son, Maurice of Nassau (Prince of Orange after his elder brother died in 1618), with the help of Johan van Oldenbarnevelt,  solidified the independence of the Dutch republic. The United Provinces survived to become the Netherlands, which is still ruled by the House of Orange-Nassau. William, Prince of Orange, ruled England as William III. Orange gave its name to other Dutch-influenced parts of the world, such as the Oranges (West Orange, South Orange, East Orange, Orange) in New Jersey and the Orange Free State in South Africa.

The city remained part of scattered Nassau holdings until it was repeatedly captured by the forces of Louis XIV during his wars of the late 17th century. The city was occupied by France in 1673, 1679, 1690, 1697 and 1702–1713 before it was finally ceded to France in 1713 under the Treaty of Utrecht. Following the French Revolution in 1789, Orange was absorbed into the French  of Drôme, then Bouches-du-Rhône, then finally Vaucluse. However, the title remained with the Dutch princes of Orange.

Orange attracted international attention in 1995, when it elected a member of National Front (FN), Jacques Bompard, as its mayor. Bompard left the FN in 2005 and became a member of the conservative Movement for France until 2010, when he founded the League of the South.

Orange was also home to the French Foreign Legion's armored  First Foreign Cavalry Regiment until 11 July 2014,
when the regiment officially moved to the Camp de Carpiagne in the 9th arrondissement of Marseille (Massif des Calanques).

Demographics
With 28,922 residents (as of 2018), Orange is the second-largest commune of Vaucluse by population after Avignon and just before Carpentras.

Main sights
The town is renowned for its Roman architecture, and its Roman theatre of Orange, is described as the most impressive still existing in Europe. The Triumphal Arch is of uncertain age, but current research accepts the inscription as evidence of a date during the reign of emperor Augustus. The arch also contains an inscription dedicated to emperor Tiberius in AD 27, when it was reconstructed to celebrate the victories of Germanicus over the German tribes in Rhineland. The arch, theatre, and surroundings were listed in 1981 by UNESCO as a World Heritage Site.

The Musée (Museum) displays the biggest (7.56 x 5.90 m) cadastral Roman maps ever recovered, etched on marble. They cover the area between Orange, Nîmes, and Montélimar.

Culture
In 1869, the Roman theatre was restored and has been the site of a music festival. The festival, given the name Chorégies d'Orange in 1902, has been held annually ever since, and is now famous as an international opera festival.

In 1971, the "New Chorégies" were started and became an overnight, international success. Many top international opera singers have performed in the theatre, such as Barbara Hendricks, Plácido Domingo, Montserrat Caballé, Roberto Alagna, René Pape and Inva Mula. Operas such as Tosca, Aida, Faust, and Carmine Karm Conte have been staged here, many with a sumptuous staging and also receiving outstanding acclaim.

The Roman theatre is one of three heritage sites at which the Roman wall remains.

Transportation

The SNCF offers rail service north to Lyon and Paris, as well as south to Avignon and Marseille.

Twin towns – sister cities

Orange is twinned with:

 Breda, Netherlands (1963)
 Byblos, Lebanon (2004)
 Diest, Belgium (1963)
 Dillenburg, Germany (1963)
 Jarosław, Poland (2000)
 Kielce, Poland (1992)
 Rastatt, Germany (1965)
 Spoleto, Italy (1981)
 Vélez-Rubio, Spain (2004)

 Weifang, China (2004)

Orange forms the Union of Orange Cities together with Breda, Diest and Dillenburg.

Climate
Orange features a humid subtropical climate (Cfa), with just too much rainfall in summer to have a 'Mediterranean' (Csa) classification. Summers are hot and relatively dry. Most rainfall occurs in spring and autumn, though with gentle temperatures. Winters are mild, but harsh frost and snow are not unheard of. On 28 June 2019 the temperature reached 41.0 °C.

See also
Communes of the Vaucluse department

References

External links

 Roman Theatre and Museum official website  
 Town council website 
 Tourist office website

 
Archaeological sites in France
Roman towns and cities in Provence
Communes of Vaucluse
World Heritage Sites in France
30s BC establishments
35 BC
Cavares
Vaucluse communes articles needing translation from French Wikipedia